The Loomis Gang were a family of outlaws who operated in Central New York during the mid-19th century.

The patriarch of the "Gang," George Washington Loomis, was a descendant of the immigrant Joseph Loomis, who arrived in the Massachusetts Bay Colony from England in the early 17th century.

Early and growth
George Washington Loomis Sr. (1779-1851) and his wife Rhoda Mallet (1793-1887), are considered to be the founders of the Loomis Gang of outlaws.  Rhoda was the daughter of Zachariah Mallet, an officer in the French Revolutionary army. He had embezzled money from the state, and fled to the United States with his family to avoid arrest. He was eventually arrested and sent to prison in 1812.

In 1806 Loomis Sr. bought property in Madison County, near the "Nine-Mile Swamp."  He married Rhoda Marie Mallet in 1814.  The couple went on to have twelve children together. Their early activities included horse theft and minor counterfeiting. The large farm that they lived on was generally profitable as well. The family engaged in more criminal activities as the children grew older. Taught by Rhoda, the children began pulling off petty thefts while still fairly young. As the children aged, in the mid-1830s, the Loomis Gang delved further in crime. The children were well educated, with Wash Loomis reading law with a local judge.

Wash became the head of the Loomis crime organization in the early 1840s. He grew the group into a multi-state syndicate, and organized it further, dividing it into regions, with regions North, South, East, and West of their farm. The Northern region was overseen by Bill Loomis in Hastings Center; and largely consisted of a horse theft ring which would steal horses, and sell them in Canada. The Southern region was headed by Grove Loomis, who ran another horse ring with a similar set up. An associate, Bill Rockwell led a similar set up western region, and Wash was in the East.

The sons specialized in theft of horses and livestock rustling, but did not stick to those activities. They also dealt in stolen goods, burglaries, and counterfeit money.  The Loomis family was the nucleus of a gang composed of youths from their area, as well as criminal elements from elsewhere.  They were successful enough, both in crime and legitimate agriculture, to be able to buy protection from the authorities.

For many years, the Loomis Gang were also careful to cultivate the goodwill of their neighbors; they generally did not steal from people who lived near them. When their neighbors suffered from thefts, those who went to the Loomis farm for help often received aid in recovering their property.  This aid helped ensure that the locals would not be willing to give evidence against the Loomis gang to outside authorities attempting to gather evidence against the family and its associates. Most people were either in the Loomis' debt or afraid of them.  Anybody who complained to the law about the Loomis' activities ran the risk of mysterious fires on their property, and the Loomis Gang always had plausible alibis.

Occasionally a Loomis or an associate of theirs would be arrested, but between bribed officials, the Loomis' excellent lawyers, and their willingness to make sure that inconvenient paperwork or evidence disappeared, they could almost always avoid conviction.

Raid 
In 1849, exasperated local people managed to get official sanction for a large raid on the Loomis' farmstead, finding twelve sleigh-loads of stolen goods. The Loomis Gang had become overconfident, keeping the goods at their farm rather than hiding them in the nearby Nine-Mile Swamp. They had gotten to know it well and used it for storing goods. The Loomis Gang avoided conviction, due to confusion about who had stolen what and who owned what goods, but Wash decided to leave the vicinity for a while. Along with thousands of other men, he migrated West to try his luck in the California gold fields during the Gold Rush.

Decline 
A few years later, Wash returned, and the Loomis gang was back in business. They had kept a low profile while he was gone, since he was the acknowledged brains of the outfit.  Despite increased official pressure from men such as Roscoe Conkling, the Loomises continued their operations very much as before, until 1865.  They took advantage of the Civil War in various ways, mainly by large-scale horse theft for sale to the Union Army.

In 1865, things rapidly came to a head.  Many men from the area were veterans of the Union Army, and four years of war had made them less willing to yield to the Loomises' intimidation and bullying.  A mob attacked the Loomis farm under the direction of James Filkins, a blacksmith and outspoken opponent of the gang. He had become the constable of Sangerfield; in the conflict, Wash Loomis was killed.

At first, the Loomises tried to carry on as before, but people had lost much of their fear of the outlaws' power. In 1866 another mob attacked their farm, burning the house and half-hanging Amos "Plumb" Loomis, in retaliation for depredations that had been laid at their door. After that, the Loomises went downhill fast; they lost their farm to tax arrears and faded into obscurity. Rhoda, Denio, and Cornelia spent their final years at Hastings, New York. With Denio, their home was on U S Route 11, across from the Bardeen one-room schoolhouse.

Legacy
The Loomis family descendants may be found in Central New York to this day. Many are proud of their descent from what was, in its time, the largest family criminal syndicate in America.

A legend in the neighborhood of their farm is that Wash Loomis' last words predicted violent death to any non-Loomis person who tried to own their farm.  Other legends speak of Wash Loomis' ghost appearing, portending death to someone, and of spectral horsemen riding the roads on October nights for revelry where the Loomis farm once stood.

George Washington Loomis, through the influence of his wife, Rhoda Marie Mallet, was considered to have disgraced the entire Loomis family in America, by that time quite large. Virtually every relative for the next hundred years took great pains to distance themselves and their own families from the highly distasteful matter. The poet Ezra Loomis Pound went so far as to have his own name legally changed.

References

Frontier Justice: The Rise and Fall of the Loomis Gang by E. Fuller Torrey, MD
The Loomis Gang by George W. Walter.
The New York Sun, History of the Loomis Gang - http://www.watervillepl.org/files/2013/05/LoomisGang1877.pdf

Additional Resources:  Loomis Family History, by Norman R. Cowen - 

Outlaw gangs in the United States
Gangs in New York (state)